Březejc is a municipality and village in Žďár nad Sázavou District in the Vysočina Region of the Czech Republic. It has about 200 inhabitants.

References

Villages in Žďár nad Sázavou District